Sliman Kchouk (born 7 May 1994) is a Tunisian international footballer who plays for Stade Tunisien as a left back.

Career
Born in Bizerte, Kchouk has played for CA Bizertin, Club Africain and FC St. Gallen. In July 2019 he was accused of racially abusing opposition player Jordi Osei-Tutu in a friendly match.

He made his international debut in 2017, and was named in the squad for the 2017 Africa Cup of Nations.

References

1994 births
Living people
Tunisian footballers
Tunisia international footballers
Association football fullbacks
CA Bizertin players
Club Africain players
FC St. Gallen players
Stade Tunisien players
Tunisian Ligue Professionnelle 1 players
Swiss Super League players
2017 Africa Cup of Nations players
Tunisian expatriate footballers
Tunisian expatriate sportspeople in Switzerland
Expatriate footballers in Switzerland
2016 African Nations Championship players
Tunisia A' international footballers